Escondido is a river in southeastern  Nicaragua.

It provides a major transportation route between the Pacific and Caribbean coasts.

Its tributaries are:
Kama River
Mahogany River
Rama River
Plata River
Mico River
Siquia River

References

Rivers of Nicaragua

Rivers of the Caribbean